Jean-Claude Gayssot (born 6 September 1944, in Béziers, Hérault) is a French politician. A member of the French Communist Party (PCF), he was Minister of Transportation in the government of Lionel Jospin of the Socialist Party from 1997 to 2002. He gave his name to the 1990 Gayssot Act repressing Holocaust denial and speech in favor of racial discrimination. He is also responsible for the Act on housing projects (loi SRU), which imposes a 20% housing projects limit in each town lest they pay a penalty fine, in an attempt to struggle against spatial segregation (Neuilly-sur-Seine, one of the wealthiest communes of France, is an often cited example of a commune which prefers to pay rather than respect the limit).

References

1944 births
Living people
People from Béziers
Politicians from Occitania (administrative region)
Transport ministers of France
French Communist Party politicians
Officiers of the Légion d'honneur